Chekanovo is a rural locality (a settlement) in Korbolikhinsky Selsoviet, Tretyakovsky District, Altai Krai, Russia. The population was 3 as of 2013. There is 1 street.

Geography 
Chekanovo is located 11 km north of Staroaleyskoye (the district's administrative centre) by road. Korbolikha is the nearest rural locality.

References 

Rural localities in Tretyakovsky District